Allen Township is an inactive township in Worth County, in the U.S. state of Missouri.

Allen Township has the name of Aaron M. Allen, a pioneer citizen  who moved from Illinois in 1843.

References

Townships in Missouri
Townships in Worth County, Missouri